Vorgartenstraße is a Metro station on the U1 Line of the Vienna U-Bahn. It is located in the Leopoldstadt District. The station was first opened to the public on September 3, 1982. Its name derives from the adjacent road "Vorgartenstraße" (literal translation: "Front-Yard-Street"), which had been named that way in 1903 due to its, at the time, unusually high number of residences containing a front yard.

References

External links 
 

Buildings and structures in Leopoldstadt
Railway stations opened in 1982
Vienna U-Bahn stations
1982 establishments in Austria
Railway stations in Austria opened in the 20th century